Kathleen Maxwell may refer to:

A pseudonym of American writer Kathryn Ptacek
A character in the miniseries V, played by Penelope Windust